is a Japanese romantic comedy television drama series that aired from 17 October to 19 December 2011. It was broadcast at 21:00 every Monday on Fuji TV (CX). The Chinese name is "我不能戀愛的理由" (Wǒ bù néng liàn ài de lǐ yóu).

Cast
 Karina Nose as Emi Fujii 
 Yuriko Yoshitaka as Saki Ogura
 Yuko Oshima (AKB48) as Mako Hanzawa
 Izumi Inamori
 Kei Tanaka
 Kana Kurashina
 Akiyoshi Nakao
 Seira Kagami
 Ryū Nakamura
 Ayame Goriki
 Masanobu Katsumura
 Masato Hagiwara

Introduction
Over half of women in their twenties and thirties say that they do not have a boyfriend. Nowadays, women are faced with issues such as men, work, sex, family, etc. That is an ice age of love. The Reason I Can't Find My Love highlights the romances of three different women.

Emi is a lighting technician in a lighting company. Because she is always working with men, she comes to behave like a boy. She is not interested in fashion or other things that girls usually care about. She does not fall in love with someone because she thinks love is tiresome. But she actually still loves her ex-boyfriend who is her colleague in the same company.

Mako is an earnest office worker. She is rather clumsy and afraid of falling in love with someone. She didn't have sex with any boy before she fell in love with one colleague.

Saki is a beautiful and prideful girl. She hopes to be a journalist but she does not realize her dream. So she has to be a hostess in a bar to help support her family. She tells her family members that she was working in a large publisher house and earned a lot of money every month. She has met a kind and helpful man who is married and fallen in love with him.

Audience ratings

Theme songs
Love Story <Amuro Namie (安室奈美惠)
Sit! Stay! Wait! Down! (Amuro Namie 安室奈美惠)

References

External links 
  

Japanese drama television series
Fuji TV dramas
2011 Japanese television series debuts
2011 Japanese television series endings
Japanese romantic comedy television series